Ra's may refer to:
 Ra's-e Jonubi
 Ra's-e Sharqi
 Ra's al Ghul

See also
 Resh, a letter in the Arabic alphabet